The Advantage Party of Alberta is a registered political party in Alberta, Canada.  The party was registered with Elections Alberta on November 9, 2018.  Its leader is Marilyn Burns, and the party's philosophy is situated on the right side of the political spectrum. Its platform includes membership driven policy, protection of individual rights and freedoms  and politician accountability.https://albertaadvantageparty.ca/wp-content/uploads/2023/01/1-CONSTITUTION-Document-Ver1-Nov-5-2022.pdf

The Advantage Party of Alberta ran 28 candidates in the 2019 Alberta general election, none of whom placed higher than fourth.  Province-wide, the party took 0.3% of the vote; its most successful candidate by vote share was Terry Blaquier in Cypress-Medicine Hat, who took 1.43% of the vote en route to a fourth-place finish in a five-candidate field.  Other top candidate placings were Gil Poitras in Leduc-Beaumont, Ron Malowany in Fort Saskatchewan-Vegreville and Kelly Zeleny in Vermilion-Lloydminster-Wainwright.

On February 5, 2022, the Alberta Advantage Party changed named its official name to the Advantage Party of Alberta as voted on at the Annual General Meeting.  On January 1, 2023, the official logo was changed after a decision by membership.

References

2018 establishments in Alberta
Provincial political parties in Alberta
Political parties established in 2018
Conservative parties in Canada
Social conservative parties